William Travis Higdon (April 27, 1924 – April 30, 1986) was an outfielder in Major League Baseball who played in eleven games for the Chicago White Sox late in the 1949 season.

References

External links

1924 births
1986 deaths
People from Tallapoosa County, Alabama
Major League Baseball outfielders
Chicago White Sox players
Baseball players from Alabama